Yesünto'a (fl. 13th c.) was the third son of Mutukan, and grandson of Chagatai, founder of the Chagatai Khanate. His brothers were Yesü Möngke and Baidar. His nephew Alghu son of Baidar and his brother Yesu Mongke, both were the Khans of the Chagatai Khanate. 

He was the father of Qara Hülëgü, the Chagatai khan (1242-1246, 1252) and Baraq, the Chagatai Khan (1266–1271).

Genealogy of Chaghatai Khanates
In Babar Nama written by Babur, Page 19, Chapter 1; described genealogy of his maternal grandfather Yunas Khan as:

"Yunas Khan descended from Chaghatai Khan, the second
son of Chingiz Khan (as follows,) Yunas Khan, son of Wais
Khan, son of Sher-'ali Aughlon, son of Muhammad Khan, son
of Khizr Khwaja Khan, son of Tughluq-timur Khan, son of
Aisan-bugha Khan, son of Dawa Khan, son of Baraq Khan,
son of Yesuntawa Khan, son of Muatukan, son of Chaghatai
Khan, son of Chingiz Khan."

Genealogy of Abdul Karim Khan
according to Tarikh-i-Rashidi of Mirza Muhammad Haidar Dughlat

Chingiz Khan
Chaghatai Khan
Mutukan
Yesü Nto'a
Ghiyas-ud-din Baraq
Duwa
Esen Buqa I
Tughlugh Timur
Khizr Khoja
Muhammad Khan (Khan of Moghulistan)
Shir Ali Oglan
Uwais Khan(Vaise Khan)
Yunus Khan
Ahmad Alaq
Sultan Said Khan
Abdurashid Khan
Abdul Karim Khan (Yarkand)

"Chughtai Khanates" A research project by Dr Abdul Rauf Mughal

Sources
The family of the Khans

References

13th-century Mongolian people
Mongol Empire people
Chagatai Khanate